Susan Elizabeth Acland-Hood is a British civil servant who is currently the Permanent Secretary at the Department for Education. Prior to taking on the role as Permanent Secretary, she was Chief Executive of HM Courts and Tribunals Service. From 2015 to 2016, Susan was Director of Enterprise and Growth at HM Treasury, responsible for policies on growth, energy, the environment, business, infrastructure, exports, competition and markets. She was Director of the Education and Funding Group at the Department for Education from 2013 to 2015, and before that held a range of posts covering education and justice policy, including in 10 Downing Street, Home Office, London Borough of Tower Hamlets, and the Social Exclusion Unit. Acland-Hood's civil service career began in the then Department for Education and Employment in 1999.

She was appointed as Permanent Secretary in September 2020 on a temporary basis and was formally appointed as Permanent Secretary on 7 December 2020.

Acland-Hood admitted to attending events that were linked to Partygate.

References

|current incumbent

British civil servants
Living people
Year of birth missing (living people)
Permanent Under-Secretaries of State for Education and Skills
Civil servants in HM Treasury